State Highway 340 (SH 340) is a  long state highway in the U.S. state of Colorado. The highway's western end is at U.S. Route 6 (US 6) and US 50 in Fruita, and the eastern end is at the junction of US 50 and I-70 Business (I-70 Bus.) in Grand Junction. This highway is mainly used by the residents of Grand Junction's suburb Redlands.

Route description 
The route begins at a concurrency of US 6 and US 50 in Fruita. The route then turns onto cherry Street in Fruita where it junctions with Interstate 70 (I-70). The Highway then moves then heads south, passing over the Colorado River, where it heads into The Redlands. There, it traverses the suburban area as Broadway Road, passing the Colorado National Monument on the south side of the highway. As SH 340 travels eastward, it enters Downtown Grand Junction, meeting again with the Colorado River and passing over the Riverside Parkway. Then, the highway ends at I-70 Bus. and US 50.

History 
The route was defined in 1939, when it moved along its current alignment but continued to US 6 in Palisade. This entire length was paved by 1955. The east terminus was then moved to SH 146, today's SH 141, in 1970. Two years later, the east terminus was moved all the way to where it is now in Grand Junction.

Major intersections

See also

 List of state highways in Colorado

References

External links 

340
Crossings of the Colorado River
Transportation in Mesa County, Colorado
Grand Junction, Colorado